The 1882 Colorado gubernatorial election was held on November 7, 1882. Democratic nominee James Benton Grant defeated Republican nominee E. L. Campbell with 51.07% of the vote.

General election

Candidates
Major party candidates
James Benton Grant, Democratic
E. L. Campbell, Republican

Other candidates
George Woy, Greenback

Results

References

1882
Colorado
Gubernatorial